Christopher Gilliland (born 1 April 1983) is a Northern Irish-born Irish professional darts player, Who currently playing in World Darts Federation (WDF) events. He qualified for the 2018 BDO World Darts Championship.

Career
In 2016, Gilliland reached the Last 64 of the WDF Europe Cup Singles. In 2017, he reached the Last 144 of the World Masters. He qualified for the 2018 BDO World Darts Championship as one of the Playoff Qualifiers, he played Justin Thompson in the preliminary round losing 3–2.

World Championship results

BDO
 2018: Preliminary Round (lost to Justin Thompson 2–3) (sets)

References

External links
 Chris Gilliland's profile and stats on Darts Database

Living people
Darts players from Northern Ireland
British Darts Organisation players
1983 births
Irish darts players